The Duke-class ships of the line were a class of four 98-gun second rates, designed for the Royal Navy by Sir John Williams.

Ships

Builder: Plymouth Dockyard
Ordered: 18 June 1771
Launched: 18 October 1777
Fate: Broken up, 1843

Builder: Plymouth Dockyard
Ordered: 16 July 1774
Launched: 5 July 1788
Fate: Broken up, 1825

Builder: Portsmouth Dockyard
Ordered: 16 July 1774
Launched: 14 October 1785
Fate: Wrecked, 1811

Builder: Chatham Dockyard
Ordered: 5 August 1777
Launched: 13 February 1782
Fate: Broken up, 1821

References

Lavery, Brian (2003) The Ship of the Line – Volume 1: The development of the battlefleet 1650–1850. Conway Maritime Press. .
Winfield, Rif (2007) British Warships in the Age of Sail 1714–1792: Design, Construction, Careers and Fates. Seaforth Publishing. .

 
Ship of the line classes